Jenő Borovszki (24 October 1899 – April 1969) was a Hungarian fencer. He competed in the team épée event at the 1936 Summer Olympics.

References

External links
 

1899 births
1969 deaths
Hungarian male épée fencers
Olympic fencers of Hungary
Fencers at the 1936 Summer Olympics